The Sucuriú River (Portuguese, Rio Sucuriú) is a river of Mato Grosso do Sul state in southwestern Brazil. It is a tributary of the Paraná River, which it joins just upriver of Eng Souza Dias (Jupiá) Dam.

See also
 List of rivers of Mato Grosso do Sul
 Tributaries of the Río de la Plata

References

Brazilian Ministry of Transport
 Rand McNally, The New International Atlas, 1993.

Rivers of Mato Grosso do Sul
Tributaries of the Paraná River